Ovsyannikovo may refer to several rural localities in Russia:

Ovsyannikovo, Kursky District, Kursk Oblast, village in Pashkovsky Selsoviet Rural Settlement, Kursky District, Kursk Oblast
Ovsyannikovo, Kovrovsky District, Vladimir Oblast, village in Klyazminskoye Rural Settlement, Kovrovsky District, Vladimir Oblast
Ovsyannikovo, Sudogodsky District, Vladimir Oblast, village in Golovinskoye Rural Settlement, Sudogodsky District, Vladimir Oblast
Ovsyannikovo, Babayevsky District, Vologda Oblast, village in Babayevsky District, Vologda Oblast
Ovsyannikovo, Kichmengsko-Gorodetsky District, Vologda Oblast, village in Gorodetskoye Rural Settlement, Kichmengsko-Gorodetsky District, Vologda Oblast
Ovsyannikovo, Sokolsky District, Vologda Oblast, village in Chuchkovskoye Rural Settlement, Sokolsky District, Vologda Oblast
Ovsyannikovo, Vologodsky District, Vologda Oblast, village in Novlenskoye Rural Settlement, Vologodsky District, Vologda Oblast